Mecopoda is the type genus of bush crickets of the subfamily Mecopodinae. Species can be found in India, China, Korea, Japan, Indochina, Malaysia and Melanesia.

Species
The genus was revised in 2021; the Orthoptera Species File now lists:
 species group Mecopoda elongata Linnaeus, 1758 - containing type species "M. maculata" Serville, which is a synonym of M. javana javana
 Other species:
 Mecopoda ampla Gorochov, 2020
 Mecopoda angusta Gorochov, 2020 (2 subspecies)
 Mecopoda dilatata Redtenbacher, 1892 (2 subspecies)
 Mecopoda divergens Redtenbacher, 1892
 Mecopoda kerinci Gorochov, 2020
 Mecopoda prominens Gorochov, 2020
 Mecopoda shveri Gorochov, 2020
 Mecopoda tenebrosa (Walker, 1869)
 Mecopoda sirambeica Griffini, 1908

Gallery

References

External links

Mecopodinae
Orthoptera of Asia
Orthoptera genera